"DJ" is a song by English singer Jamelia. It was written by Jamelia, Carsten Schack, Kenneth Karlin, Philip White, Alex Cantrall and Olivia Longott for the reissue of her second studio album, Thank You (2003), while production was helmed by Schack and Karlin under their production moniker Soulshock & Karlin. 
The song takes its main tune from Raymond Guiot's "Primitive Spirit". "DJ" was released as the fifth and final single from the album on a double A-side along with Jamelia's cover of Sam Brown's song "Stop".

Promotion and chart performance
"DJ" was released on 1 November 2004, one of the busiest release weeks of the year competing with Eminem, Destiny's Child, Usher & Alicia Keys, Britney Spears, and Christina Aguilera & Missy Elliott. However, the single still managed to get a UK top ten place, despite the stiff competition and became her fourth consecutive top ten hit, spending twelve weeks inside the UK Singles Chart, one week longer than "See It in a Boy's Eyes", despite having a lower peak. The single also became her fourth consecutive top forty hit in Australia, peaking at number thirty-seven there.

Track listings

Charts

Weekly charts
"DJ"/"Stop"

Year-end charts
"DJ"/"Stop"

References

2003 songs
2004 singles
Jamelia songs
Parlophone singles
Song recordings produced by Soulshock and Karlin
Songs written by Kenneth Karlin
Songs written by Soulshock